Field Marshal Chakrabongse Bhuvanath, the Prince of Bishnulok (3 March 1883 – 13 June 1920), was the 40th child of King Chulalongkorn and the fourth child of Queen Sri Bajarindra.

Biography

The prince was sent to the Russian Empire in his teens, where he studied at the Page Corps. He returned to Siam with an honorary commission in a Hussar regiment and a wife, Catherine Desnitski from Lutsk (at that time part of the Russian Empire), whom he had married in 1906. The Prince and his wife lived with their son, Prince Chula Chakrabongse, in Paruskavan Palace in Bangkok. They later divorced and he remarried the year before his death.

The prince was a favourite son of both the King and Queen. He travelled extensively, visiting among other countries the US and United Kingdom in 1902. He also represented his father on foreign visits, such as for the funeral of King Umberto I of Italy in 1900, the wedding of Crown Prince Wilhelm and Crown Princess Cecilie of Prussia in 1905, and the coronation of King George V and Queen Mary of the United Kingdom in 1911.

He and his brother Prince Purachatra, Commander of the Army Engineers, were instrumental in the development of aviation in the Kingdom. Prince Chakrabongse is best remembered today as the father of the army's Royal Aeronautical Service, a forerunner to the Royal Thai Air Force.

Prince Chakrabongse served as Chief of Staff of the Royal Siamese Army until his death. He died from pneumonia in 1920 at the age of 37.

Ancestry

References

 His Royal Highness Prince Chakrabongse Bhuvanath, Prince of Bisnulok

1883 births
1920 deaths
19th-century Thai people
19th-century Chakri dynasty
20th-century Chakri dynasty
Thai male Chao Fa
Chakrabongse family
Field marshals of Thailand
Knights Grand Cordon of the Order of Chula Chom Klao
Knights of the Ratana Varabhorn Order of Merit
Knights Grand Commander (Senangapati) of the Order of Rama
Recipients of the Dushdi Mala Medal, Pin of Arts and Science
Deaths from pneumonia in Thailand
Children of Chulalongkorn
Sons of kings

Non-inheriting heirs presumptive